Colonel John Dooly (1740–1780), born in Wilkes County, Georgia, was an American Revolutionary war hero. He commanded a regiment at the Battle of Kettle Creek in 1779 and was killed at his home by Tories in 1780.

History
Early twentieth-century Georgia historian Otis Ashmore wrote that "of the many heroic men who illustrated that stormy period of the Revolution in Georgia that 'tried men's souls' none deserves a more grateful remembrance by posterity than Col. John Dooly."(n1) Ashmore's subsequent entry, however, failed to meet that need because, before the bicentennial of the American Revolution, almost all of the source material on Dooly came from Hugh McCall's The History of Georgia (1816). Collectively, what McCall wrote about the colonel formed an heroic tale of a martyred battlefield leader in the struggle for American independence who lost a brother in an Indian attack, led Patriot forces to victory over the Tories (Loyalist Americans who supported the British cause) at the Battle of Kettle Creek and, finally, died at the hands of Tories in his own home.(n2) Unintentionally, McCall gave literature its first Georgia folk hero.

Behind The Story 
Dooly's story, however, would not remain in that part of Patriot lore described by historian Hugh Bicheno as "propaganda not merely triumphing over historical substance, but virtually obliterating it."(n3) Research on the Revolution since Ashmore's time has evolved from only the major military events of that war to the world in which it occurred. Dooly's life, for example, illustrates how he and his neighbors in the ceded lands had been moving for greater control of their frontier world. This struggle occurred before, during, and after the Revolution. He emerges, in that context, as a man of motives and actions more complex than McCall's simplistic although basically accurate account.(n4)

Father and Son
John Dooly's role in those events began with his father Patrick. Everything known about Patrick Dooly's life parallels that of the archetypical traditional and historical southern Scots-Irish frontiersman, as portrayed in works like David Hackett Fischer's Albion's Seed: Four British Folkways in America.(n5) Likely a native Irishman, he appeared in frontier Frederick County, Virginia, land records as early as 1755. As with many other Virginians, Patrick moved to the South Carolina frontier sometime between August 2, 1764, and July 2, 1765, according to land grant records, likely in search of unclaimed property to develop for sale to later settlers and for security from conflicts with the Indians. His subsequent deed records indicate that he had a wife named Anne and that he could at least sign his name.(n6) A few years later, an adult John Dooly traveled hundreds of miles from the Ninety Six frontier to Charleston, the seat of the only local government body in South Carolina, to go through the legal formalities to settle his father's insignificant estate. The probate records prove that both Patrick and Anne had died by December 6, 1768, because on that date John received all of his father's property as the nearest male relative under the then-current laws of primogeniture. The inventory showed a household that possessed a slave woman, a female slave child, books, household goods, and the remains of a small wheelwright or blacksmith operation. John sold off the estate's only other asset: his father's last tracts of land.(n7)

Growing Family
Patrick and John Dooly would share land development in common but, as proved more typical with later leaders of the Revolution than its opponents, father and son followed significantly different lives.(n8) By means unknown, John acquired an education and, on February 3, 1768, secured a commission as deputy surveyor. The colony of South Carolina employed him in 1771, quite likely as a participant in the expedition to help the colony's surveyor Ephraim Mitchell locate and mark the boundary with North Carolina. Within a few years, Dooly became a merchant and a land developer far beyond anything his father had achieved.(n9) John married Dianna Mitchell, quite likely related to the many Mitchells who were South Carolina surveyors, including cartographer John Mitchell and the deputy surveyor Thomas Mitchell. The latter also became the first husband of Dooly's sister Elizabeth. John and Dianna Dooly had a growing family by 1773, eventually numbering at least two sons, John Mitchell and Thomas, and a daughter Susannah. By that time, John had made his brothers Thomas and George his protégés, with Thomas even becoming a deputy surveyor.(n10)

General accounts of the lives of such backcountry people as the Doolys survive but suffer from being highly prejudiced. Englishman Charles Woodmason, for example, described the people of this frontier as living little different from their livestock. In 1774, Scotsman William Mylne wrote less passionately. He lived alone in the woods on a rented farm on Steven's Creek, South Carolina, near Dooly-owned land but also close to Augusta. Mylne's house consisted of a sixteen by twenty foot enclosure made from stacked pine logs and covered with a clapboard roof. When not keeping snakes and the resident cat from eating his chickens, he subsisted by hunting and fishing. His stout and well-made male neighbors lived like Indians; they followed their livestock while their women stayed home to plant a wide variety of grains, vegetables, and fruits. Mylne wrote of how the colorfully dressed and largely Baptist backcountry people raised tobacco that they took to distant cities like Charleston and Savannah to sell. That product would travel to Europe and then return for purchase by the original growers as snuff. Frontier people could barter for goods from local merchants like John Dooly, but they found the prices in such stores to be too high.(n11)

A Changing Frontier
The growing number of Baptists in the backcountry, members of a new Protestant religion that Anglican minister Charles Woodmason noted with great disdain, represented one of the many important changes along the frontier. Sanders Walker, one of the appraisers of Patrick Dooly's estate, had been a Baptist minister in South Carolina since 1767. He and his fellow locally ordained clergymen created their own revolution in filling a long-standing demand for ministers in the backcountry where the need could not be met by the traditional religions that required men like Woodmason to obtain formal training. That Baptists appeared in large numbers among all political factions on the frontier during the Revolution illustrates that this social change, like so many others, transcended the conflict of 1775-1783.(n12)

The South Carolina Regulator rebellion that broke out among backcountry people and literally at John Dooly's very door in Ninety Six in the late 1760s serves as an even greater example of what historian Jack Greene described as settlers on the southern frontier desiring "improvement" in the form of courthouses, schools, towns, and an environment conducive to trade and investment. Civil affairs on the South Carolina frontier proved so confused that Dooly's father, for example, once received a grant of land that appears in various colonial records as being in three different counties, none of which had a courthouse or any other form of local government. Rev. Charles Woodmason, a Regulator supporter, denounced what he viewed as a morally uninhibited culture in frontier South Carolina, but he also saw the growth of its population as dynamic (he claimed that ninety-four out of every one hundred brides in ceremonies he performed were obviously with child) and that its economy grew as fast. Its struggle became an economic revolution in the form of opportunities emerging so fast as to force a breakdown of any limitations placed on it. Thousands of frontiersmen like Dooly participated in that colonial revolution and demanded from South Carolina's government (what historian Hugo Bicheno termed as "Tidewater Rats" and "wealthy coastal slavocrats" with a "psedo-aristiocratic social structure") the right to the benefits of rule of law in the backcountry. As with almost all of the frontiersmen directly affected by that successful and sometimes violent popular uprising to force the establishment of courts on the frontier, Dooly's name appears on none of the surviving records, including on the list of pardons granted to one hundred and twenty Regulator leaders.(n13)

Legislative Nightmares
As a merchant, land speculator, and surveyor, however, Dooly benefited in many ways from the success of the Regulators, as did the millers and blacksmiths who also would assume leadership roles in the backcountry. Further progress on the frontier, for him and other ambitious men of the new and growing middle class in the region, required meaningful civil government. Previously Dooly had to travel the hundreds of miles to Charleston to file or answer court suits. In 1771, for example, he had to go to the provincial capital to defend himself in a case over a debt based on a document to which his name had been crudely forged two years earlier. In another instance, Dooly took William Thomson to court over debts due for a long list of trade goods. The latter apparently finally settled the dispute with land. Soon after, however, Thomson filed a civil suit for damages against Dooly for having "beat bruise wound & evilly entreat him so that his life was greatly despaired" with "swords & staves." Dooly countered that Thomson had repeatedly threatened his life.(n14)

Bigger Investments
John Dooly's own time to take a public leadership role came later and further west, in Georgia. In January 1772, after the peace and security of the new courts brought about a rise in property values on the South Carolina frontier, he mortgaged  of his lands to Charles Pinckney of Charleston. With his new capital, Dooly could finance a major investment. Four months later, as a resident of South Carolina, he petitioned to secure land across the Savannah River in St. Paul Parish near Augusta on the colonial Georgia frontier. He also obtained a commission as a Georgia deputy surveyor and had by then acquired seven slaves.(n15) Dooly shortly afterwards abandoned these beginnings for another prospect. George Galphin and other Georgia and South Carolina traders had tried to compel the Cherokee Indians to trade a large tract of land to pay for the growing debts allegedly owed to them. In 1773, Georgia royal governor James Wright preempted this plan and persuaded the Creek and Cherokee nations to give up what he named the Ceded Lands, some  that would greatly expand the northwest border of St. Paul Parish. The Indians received a cancellation of their debts, which Wright planned to pay by selling the new lands, a plan that benefited the British government by almost simultaneously ending all of the free headright grants in America. The additional territory, in theory, would significantly add to Georgia's colonial population and militia numbers by being limited exclusively to persons like the Doolys from other colonies. Ceded Lands sales also paid for a company of rangers who would serve as a form of civil protection from bandits that settlers from the pre-Regulator days of South Carolina could particularly appreciate.(n16)

In 1759, Thomas Lee of South Carolina had obtained a warrant of survey to this land on the indeterminate edge of what was then the Georgia Indian frontier, but he had never obtained a formal grant. Dooly, like most of his neighbors, borrowed money from prominent Lt. Thomas Waters of the rangers to make the initial payment on his acquisition, which he named "Egypt." He also obtained loans from Savannah merchants to pay for further improvements, and he may have raised still more funds by selling three slaves.(n17) Dooly thus set out to create a plantation similar to the much larger venture begun by his new neighbor on the Savannah River, wealthy Englishman Thomas Waters. The latter had been a resident of Georgia and South Carolina since at least 1760, when he had worked for a previous company of rangers as quartermaster.(n18)

Biblical Prophesy
This opening of the Ceded Lands came during, and became part of, a transitional period in local government on the Georgia frontier that, like the Regulator rebellion, predated the American Revolution. At that time, naturalist William Bartram passed through this area twice and would write a description that reads like a biblical prophecy of its coming troubles: The day's progress was agreeably entertaining, from the novelty and variety of objects and views; the wild country now almost depopulated, vast forests, expansive plains and detached groves; then chains of hills whose gravelly, dry, barren summits present detached piles of rocks, which delude and flatter the hopes and expectations of the solitary traveller, full sure of hospitable habitations; heaps of white, gnawed bones of the ancient buffaloe, elk and deer, indiscriminately mixed with those of men, half grown over with moss, altogether exhibit scenes of uncultivated nature, on reflection, perhaps, rather disagreeable to a mind of delicate feelings and sensibility, since some of these objects recognize past transactions and events, perhaps not altogether reconcilable to justice and humanity.(n19)

In 1768, Gov. James Wright avoided the troubles of the South Carolina frontier by siding with his backcountry people in their successful political campaign to have the colonial assembly establish courts at Augusta and Halifax. Georgia's backcountry also had, for several years, sent representatives to the colonial assembly, such as Leonard Claiborne and Edward Barnard, prominent men who lived on the frontier and had their fortunes tied to its future. When raiding parties of disaffected Creeks protested the loss of the Ceded Lands by attacking its settlements and defeating the St. Paul's Parish militia in 1773-1774, Wright used diplomacy with pro-British Indian leader Emistisiguo to end the crisis. This Creek headman bluntly complained of how Indian agent John Stuart, Governor Wright, and other British leaders used him to act against the best interests of his people. But he had also risen to power from humble beginnings due to British support; Wright had even commissioned him as commander and head warrior of the Creeks in September 1768. The Creek headman reciprocated by literally giving the king's officials a lifetime commitment, even to the extent of arranging for the assassinations of the leaders of the raids on the Ceded Lands settlements.(n20)

Colonial Wranglings
The backcountry people in Georgia later repaid Wright for this past support. Opposing the largely coastal opposition to British policies in 1774, a delegation from the frontier (that included Dooly) tried to present Georgia's rebel provincial congress with a letter of protest against the growing political discontent in the colony. The backcountry dissenters argued that Georgia had no connection with troubles over taxation, tea, or Boston, and that the province depended upon the king's protection from the neighboring tribes of Indians. Representatives of the growing Revolutionary movement (the Whigs), meeting at Tondee's tavern in the province's capital of Savannah, refused to receive the delegation. As a result, John Dooly, Elijah Clarke, George Wells, Barnard Heard, and many other later Whig leaders, joined hundreds of their neighbors in exercising their rights as Englishmen to sign and publish petitions in support of British rule in the colony's newspaper, the Georgia Gazette.(n21)

Future circumstances would prove that the frontiersmen actually acted, as their protest implied, primarily from their own self interests.(n22) As Dooly and his neighbors knew from the colonial gazettes, the British army could shoot Americans in Massachusetts but it could not be found on the frontier protecting them from the Indians.(n23)

The Whigs also had much to offer to the frontiersmen, starting with local control of their own affairs. Dooly already served as a colonel, with Stephen Heard as lieutenant colonel, and Bernard Heard as major in a vigilante militia created by him and his neighbors.(n24)

As happened in later revolutions, the rebels in Georgia divided the province into districts, in this instance, each with a justice of the peace court, political committee, and a militia company. Dooly served as captain of his local company, with his brother Thomas as a first lieutenant. The former also obtained the positions of justice of the peace and deputy surveyor, and he likely served on his local Chatham District's political committee. On February 11, 1776, Governor Wright fled to a British vessel after frontiersmen fired at but missed the royal official. As those same ships threatened Savannah, Dooly marched his company for four days from the Ceded Lands to reach the threatened town to serve on behalf of the rebellion, at least for pay.(n25)

Against the Indians
Sixty of his neighbors under Jacob Colson headed for South Carolina to help in putting down a counter revolution by the king's supporters. In response to Cherokee Indian raids of that summer of 1776, Dooly and his company, as part of an expedition under Maj. Samuel Jack, destroyed two villages. Virginia and both of the Carolinas contributed thousands more men in simultaneous campaigns that wrecked that Indian nation. Jack's force, however, demonstrated that even Georgia, with its comparatively small population, could provide something toward a united Whig effort of the southern frontier.(n26) The majority of southern frontiersmen now supported the rebellion, as Scotsman Baika Harvey, a new arrival in Georgia, wrote to his Godfather in 1775.

Experienced Militiamen
Frontiersmen like Dooly had significant military experience to contribute to this new rebel army. Far from being a mob, the frontiersmen had decades of experience in military organization and discipline. Even his father in Virginia in the 1760s had been a member of the militia. Andrew Pickens, John Dooly's later ally had also served in the militia in the French and Indian War, alongside British regulars whose cruelty he found appalling. A record survives indicating that Pickens later kept careful accounts, as public property, of items captured in the fight at Kettle Creek. A formal morning report of Dooly's militia regiment in 1779 shows that it was a sophisticated organization with quartermasters, musicians, boatmen, blacksmiths, cow drivers, butchers, wagon masters, and deputy commissaries. Even his later subordinate, the illiterate Lt. Col. Elijah Clarke, had his routine orders placed in writing.(n28)

Georgia's new Whig government would work to support and win over these people with money, munitions, commissions, and salt. In 1778, and during the years that followed, Dooly and his neighbors erected a string of forts to provide additional protection from Indian attack. Absalom Chappell remembered such extensive efforts made by the backcountry people at building defenses:

"By their own voluntary labor the people of each neighborhood, when numerous enough, built what was dignified as a fort, a strong wooden stockade or blockhouse, entrenched, loop-holed, and surmounted with look-outs at the angles. Within this rude extemporized fortress ground enough was enclosed to allow room for huts or tents for the surrounding families when they should take refuge therein—a thing which continually occurred; and, indeed, it was often the case, that the fort became a permanent home for the women and children, while the men spent days in scouring the country, and tilling with their slaves, lands within convenient reach; at night betaking themselves to the stronghold for the society and protection of their families, as well as for their own safety."(n29)

These forts served as only temporary refuge, however. A Mrs. Newton later related to Jeremiah Evarts that after she shut her door "she dared not open it, for fear of seeing Indians; and when it was open, she dared not shut it, for fear Indians would approach unseen. The settlers could not live all the while in forts, because they must gain subsistence from the land, and they could not live all the while on their farms without imminent danger."(n30)

The Continental Congress did not intend to rely on just the militia but authorized the creation of five regiments of full-time continental soldiers, as well as ships and artillery batteries, for the defense of the province. Georgia had such a small population, however, that the recruits for this brigade had to be found elsewhere. Dooly obtained a commission as a captain in the new Georgia Regiment of Continental Horse. With his brothers Thomas Dooly and George Dooly, captain and second lieutenant respectively, as well as brother-in-law Thomas Mitchell, who was first lieutenant in the Third Georgia Continental Battalion, they traveled to Virginia to find recruits using £400 that John had borrowed from Peter Perkins but which he never repaid. In Guilford County, North Carolina, and Pittsylvania County, Virginia, John Dooly and his relations succeeded in enlisting ninety-seven men, including deserters illegally recruited from the local military. Upon returning to Georgia, John went to Savannah to collect his bounty money while his brother Thomas took a company to a post on the frontier.

Thomas's Death
The consequences of making a commitment into the Revolution now affected John Dooly in a most personal way. On July 22, 1777, Thomas Dooly, with twenty-one men in two companies, set out to return to their post after having recovered some horses stolen by Creek war parties led by Emistisiguo. Some two miles (3 km) from Skull Shoals on the Oconee River, fifty Indians launched an ambush. Thomas Dooly fell with a wound to his heel string. Unable to move, he cried out in vain to his fleeing comrades not to leave him to suffer death at the hands of the Indians.

This attack, which ended Thomas Dooly's life, came as part of a massive campaign by British Indian superintendent John Stuart to disrupt the efforts of the Indian trader George Galphin, a former ally of Governor Wright who had reluctantly agreed to serve as Indian commissioner for the Whigs in the South. The Indian commissioner worked to move the tribes to a neutral position. John Dooly inadvertently played into Stuart's plans when he seized a Creek delegation that had come to visit Galphin in order to hold them as hostages until he had satisfaction for his brother's death. With great effort, Galphin and the rebel authorities compelled Dooly to release the delegation and, later, to surrender a fort where he and his supporters had barricaded themselves. Galphin then persuaded the Creek delegates that they were being protected from a plot to murder them by Emistisiguo and other British agents. As the headman had arranged such assassinations for the British before the war, the story had credibility. The delegates, upon returning home, led a war party that would have killed Emistisiguo and David Taitt but for the physical intervention of rising Creek leader Alexander McGillivray. After various delays, Captain Dooly stood trial in Savannah and then resigned his commission. He must have believed that while continental authorities could not or would not move against Indians, they could deal effectively with him.(n31)

Tough Times
Dooly's problems came at a time when his neighbors debated related issues. Dr. George Wells, the protégé of the pioneer Georgia populist politician Button Gwinnett, organized a clique in the Ceded Lands that petitioned the American commander of the southern forces to invade and seize the Creek lands. Both Wells and Gwinnett had controversial pasts as perennial failures and misfits, the type of characters who often lead, if not create, radical factions in revolutions. Wells spearheaded a petition drive to have the Continental Congress remove Georgia's continental commander, Lachlan McIntosh, on the grounds that he was incompetent, the "murderer" of Gwinnett in a duel, and connected by blood with pro-British Indian leaders. John Dooly had every reason to have supported, or even assumed a leadership position in Wells's movement. Nonetheless, he, Clarke, and other Whig leaders in the Ceded Lands did not sign Wells's petition. John Coleman, formerly of Virginia and a wealthy leader in the Ceded Lands, also opposed the petition and even wrote to McIntosh complaining that "Gentlemen of Abilities, whose characters are well established, are the only persons objected to, to govern and manage in State affairs with us. The Consiquence [sic] of which I fear, we too soon will see to our sorrow."(n32)

Within a year, John Dooly did make a comeback. Progress in local government moved quickly in the new state of Georgia and Dooly took advantage of it. He sought bounty land for building a mill and for the military service of himself and his deceased brother. What had been the Ceded Lands became, under Georgia's constitution of 1777, Wilkes County, the state's first county. Dooly served as its representative in the new one-house state legislature, which eventually gave him and fellow legislator John Coleman turns on the Executive Council that supervised the actions of the governor. Coleman and Dooly received orders from the council to qualify Thomas Waters and Isaac Herbert as justices of the peace in Wilkes County. For reasons not given, they instead gave the commissions to Edward Keating and Jacob Coleson, an action that the council ordered suspended. No further information on this matter appears in the council minutes but, a few months later, Thomas Waters came before the council to take an oath under the act for the expulsion of enemies from the state. John and George Dooly made payments to Georgia for grants of new land in 1778. With the death of Coleman from disease that summer, John Dooly rose to command his county's militia. In this position, he led his neighbors against Creek raiders and won a victory against the Indians at Newsome's Ponds. At almost the same time, Dooly also became the county's first sheriff and, as such, had suspected Loyalists arrested, searched, and confined in chains. In late December, the local electorate voted him as their colonel, with battle-scarred veteran Elijah Clarke as his lieutenant colonel and Burwell Smith as major. Clarke, an illiterate frontiersman of modest means, had been on the rise in the Revolution from his abilities as an almost fatally courageous military leader. Smith, formerly of Virginia, had received an appointment to Thomas Dooly's command in the Georgia Continentals following the latter's death.(n33)

For John Dooly this success as a popularly elected leader came at a price. That December, a British land and naval force captured Savannah. Redcoats overran Georgia, except for Wilkes County, and occupied nearby Augusta by the end of January 1779. Fourteen hundred Georgians came forward to sign oaths accepting British protection and acknowledging an obligation to serve in the king's militia. A man named Freeman, apparently accompanying a party of local Baptists, arrived at Augusta to offer the surrender of the county's forts and civilians. Eighty Loyalist horsemen under Scottish captains John Hamilton and Dugald Campbell then set out to receive those submissions. As he later related to a British writer, however, Hamilton discovered that "although many of the people came in to take the oath of allegiance, the professions of a considerable number were not to be depended upon; and that some came in only for the purpose of gaining information on his strength and future designs. In various quarters, he met with opposition and all their places of strength held out until they were reduced. The reduction of most of these was not, however, a work of great difficulty, as they consisted only of stockade forts, calculated for defense against the Indians."(n34) Dooly, and whatever men would follow him, withdrew to South Carolina to seek help.

Dooly, now a militia colonel without a state, faced a particular problem in finding allies in South Carolina. During the previous summer's Indian troubles, more than five hundred South Carolina militiamen had come to Wilkes County's aid under Gen. Andrew Williamson, originally an illiterate cattle driver from near Dooly's former home at Ninety Six who had risen to wealth and prominence before the war. The South Carolinians failed to discover any hostile Creeks, or even Dooly and his Georgia militiamen; they only found local people who overcharged them for provisions. Williamson wrote to his subordinates that Dooly could not be trusted and to avoid having any future dealings with him. Now, Dooly needed help from those same men.(n35)

Dooly made an appeal to Andrew Pickens, colonel of the Upper Ninety Six Regiment and Williamson's long time subordinate. Pickens and his command were guarding the Carolina frontier against the Cherokees while Williamson and the rest of his brigade were trying to block the British forces at Augusta from entering South Carolina. Pickens brought two hundred men to Dooly's aid but, once in Georgia, he insisted upon and received command of all of their forces. Together they pursued Hamilton's and Campbell's horsemen across Wilkes County, northeast to southwest, from Thomas Waters's plantation, near the mouth of the Broad River, to Heard's Fort. They finally caught up with and besieged their prey at Robert Carr's Fort, near the Little River and the last outpost in Wilkes County that the horsemen intended to visit.

After an attempt to entrap the Loyalists between the fort and his men failed, Pickens had the fort's water supply cut off as he prepared to use a burning wagon and even cannons to force the besieged into surrendering. He then received news that hundreds, perhaps thousands, of Loyalists from North and South Carolina were en route to Georgia with the clear intention of joining the British in Augusta. Pickens chose to give up the siege of Carr's Fort and withdrew his forces in the night on February 12.(n36) He made a decision to intercept the new threat despite the fact that, in doing so, he gave up a certain victory in hopes of finding and defeating an enemy much larger in numbers than his own command. Pickens also abandoned any advantage he might have held if the approaching enemy force passed near Carr's Fort en route to sympathizers at the nearby Wrightsborough settlement. Dooly had a deposition taken by justice of the peace Stephen Heard wherein a William Millen had described meeting a Loyalist leader identified as James Boyd, when the latter had recently been at Wrightsborough seeking guides to South Carolina. Boyd had carried a proclamation from the British commander now in Augusta that called for Americans to join the king's army.(n37) Dooly must have understood that the Redcoats at Augusta expected the arrival of Boyd with a significant force of Loyalists from the Carolinas, guided in the last of their journey by the horsemen under Hamilton and Campbell. He also knew that to follow Pickens in returning to South Carolina to intercept the otherwise largely unknown enemy risked a great deal.

Complications
Men of the two state militias had already joined and clashed with the oncoming Loyalist force with disastrous results at Vann's Creek, Georgia, on February 10. Pickens's and Dooly's combined Whig command tried to pursue the Loyalists in South Carolina and then, into Wilkes County, before rendezvousing with the survivors of the Vann's Creek battle. The militiamen found themselves back at Carr's Fort two nights after having left it and after two days of long marches. Boyd and his ad hoc regiment of North and South Carolina Loyalists camped at a cowpen or small farm in a meadow atop a steep hill in a bend of swampy Kettle Creek, less than a mile from Carr's Fort and hardly much further from Wrightsborough, on Sunday morning February 14. Pickens then ordered a complicated attack through thick canebrakes, creeks, and woods with his combined force of only three hundred and forty men. The some six hundred Loyalists who held a strong position on both sides of the creek knew that they were being pursued, but they had a capable leader in Colonel Boyd, a man reportedly known to Pickens and quite possibly an acquaintance of Dooly. Pickens sent Dooly and Clarke to lead columns through the woods and swamps to assault the enemy camp on the flanks. When Pickens directed his own men up a narrow path to attack a cowpen atop the hill in the center, Boyd launched an ambush. Dooly would later write that only the hand of Providence saved him, Clarke, and Pickens, as they exposed themselves on horseback during the fight at Kettle Creek. Unbeknownst to the militiamen, they had not assaulted the main Loyalist camp, but merely a location where some of their enemy had found a cow to butcher for a meal. Most of the king's men had crossed the creek and camped on the west side, from where they rallied and then decided, individually, whether to join in the fight or slip away to their Carolina homes.

Still, Pickens's usual good luck had held. Many of the Loyalists, having come along only under threats and intimidation, had already deserted before the battle began. Three of Dooly's rifle men found themselves behind the lines and mortally wounded the enemy commander. Elijah Clarke, despite having a horse shot out from under him, led a successful charge against Loyalists across the creek. Unable to find John Moore of North Carolina, their second in command, most of the king's men fled, either back to the Carolinas or to sympathizers in the nearby settlement of Wrightsborough. From the latter, 270 of their number would be rescued by their pro-British allies. By the afternoon, Pickens, Dooly, and Clarke had won an overwhelming victory.(n38)

Indians and Loyalists
A month later, George Galphin received warning of an approaching pro-British Indian invasion of seven hundred warriors under David Taitt and Emistisiguo. This force of Indians and Loyalists burned Folsom's Fort and other outposts along the Ogeechee River in what was then western Wilkes County. South Carolina militiamen again came to the rescue. The Indians with Alexander McGillivray met defeat at Rocky Comfort Creek on March 29 at the hands of militiamen under colonels Leroy Hammond of South Carolina and Benjamin Few of Georgia. The battle resulted in the deaths of nine Indians, including two headmen, and three Loyalists who had accompanied them. Among the three Indians and three "white savages" (white men who lived as Indians) captured was Emistisiguo's son. The next day, Pickens and Dooly led their men against Emistisiguo himself. Three Indians were reportedly killed at the head of the Ogeechee River. In the face of such opposition, most of Taitt's followers deserted; he had only seventy warriors still with him when he reached Savannah. The men of the Georgia militia paraded the scalps of their victims in Augusta although they released Emistisiguo's son as a peace gesture. Pickens and Williamson now had high praise for Dooly and specifically for the intelligence from his network of scouts.(n39)

Such victories by the militia as these reversed the overall military situation. As a writer in a British publication noted about the war in general: "Most of these actions would in other wars be considered as skirmishes of little account, and scarcely worthy of a detailed narrative. But these small actions are as capable as any of displaying conduct. The operations of war being spread over the vast continent…it is by such skirmishes that the fate of America must be decided. They are therefore as important as battles in which a hundred thousand men are drawn up on each side."(n40)

The British army had withdrawn from Augusta just hours before Boyd met defeat. Georgians who had taken the king's oaths disappeared and the Redcoats found themselves unable to control much more than the actual ground their regular army occupied. These professional soldiers from the fortified garrisons in New York and East Florida continued to win the formal battles only to lose the war to a widespread popular resistance that won by keeping the insurgency going indefinitely. British leaders had been led to believe that thousands of frontiersmen remained willing to fight for the king's cause in a campaign of Americanizing the war. The hundreds of men who did turn out under leaders like Boyd, however, actually came from socially isolated frontier communities of Quakers, Baptists, bandits, ex-North Carolina Regulators, Irish emigrants, Palatines, white men who lived with the Indians, Native Americans, freed/self-emancipated blacks, and other perennial social outsiders from the frontier mainstream society. These "Loyalists" acted more as refugees trying to find protection than as committed combatants. Even the survivors of Kettle Creek and Taitt's warriors who reached Savannah proved to be of little military value to the king George iii

New Government
Any such ambitions for a restored British rule in America represented the "past;" John Dooly and his allies had become the powers of the "present." In what remained of Whig Georgia, he subsequently would simultaneously hold the state's highest positions in the military, government, and judiciary. As the highest ranking officer left in the state militia, he became the colonel commandant. Retreating elected officials finally created an extralegal executive council at Augusta to act as a civil government (with Dooly as a member). Historian Robert M. Weir has pointed out that the Regulator rebellion had taught the frontiersmen that leaders who failed to act against persons perceived as public enemies risked losing credibility with their followers. Faced with mortal threats from external enemies, the new council appointed Dooly as state's attorney to prosecute, in cases of treason, the most active local British collaborators. At a court held at Jacob McClendon's house in August 1779, Dooly prosecuted several of his neighbors. Nine of these "Tories" were condemned to die for treason but the ad hoc state government granted reprieves to all but two of them.(n42) North and South Carolina also held trials that condemned and hanged seven participants of Boyd's uprising as civil criminals.(n43)

Georgia's first state government would leave more than that legacy, including the creation of county government, as a part of the broader history of progress on the frontier. Courts had been held in Wilkes County as early as 1778, with John Dooly as at least a plaintiff. In 1780, Wilkes had a permanent courthouse in Washington, a town laid out specifically as the county seat and with Dooly as one of its original commissioners.(n44) Simultaneously, John Dooly and his neighbors affirmed that they, when cooperating, could do almost anything that they wanted in their own affairs. Dooly, Pickens, Williamson, and their comrades had thwarted their enemy's plans to create a counterrevolution and invasions by Indian war parties. The continental and state military establishments in the South, by contrast, often failed the frontiersmen.
The situation in Wilkes County remained grave, however. Much of Georgia had become a no-man's land between the opposing factions where guerrillas and apolitical gangs acted as destructive brigands who took advantage of the vacuum of civil law, much like South Carolina's frontier had been before the Regulators. British general Augustin Prevost in Savannah, seeking to protect the frontier Loyalists, wrote to Williamson in early April 1779 requesting a truce for the northwest frontier that he refused to refer to as Wilkes County. Gov. John Rutledge of South Carolina adamantly declined the offer. Williamson did send sixty men to bolster Dooly's command. He sought to discourage the people of the county from moving to the safety of North Carolina and Virginia while encouraging other frontier families to flee with them. Maj. Burwell Smith arrived in the camp of Gen. Benjamin Lincoln, commander of the southern department, to present John Dooly's pleas for money for the Georgia militia. The general advanced $8,295.70 to cover the expenses of the Georgia militiamen from January 1 to March 1, 1779, and $1,000 to Dooly, although he demanded the return of notarized vouchers justifying the disbursement of the money. The situation had not improved by August, however, when General McIntosh wrote to Lincoln from the Georgia frontier that "the few Militia in this area to stick yet to their Integrity & have not Joined the Enemy or Shamefully left us altogether to ourselves do not exceed Six hundred men, are much scattered & chiefly pinned up in little Forts to Secure their Families from the Savages to whom they are exposed & harass them continually, Loath to Leave them upon any Emergency, are now almost tired out & despairing to see any effective assistance come to them, are Selling off, and leaving us also."(n45)

Hard Fighting
Despite such a grim situation, Dooly committed himself to using the new frontier self-empowerment for driving the British from Savannah and thus ending any hopes of returning the South to colonial rule. He left Elijah Clarke to defend the frontier while he and Burwell Smith led a series of campaigns against a British army that they did not perceive as liberators or protectors. In the summer of 1779, Dooly marched with his militiamen to the mouth of Briar Creek, in Burke County, Georgia, Dooly had the dead from the Basttle of Briar Creek buried and recovered a cannon. (n46)

Most of the British forces in Georgia invaded South Carolina, General Lincoln pleaded with the Georgians to launch a diversionary campaign to retake Savannah. Dooly gathered four hundred Georgia militiamen at Augusta and sent a request to Lincoln for supplies, arms, medicine, and money, even though he had failed, as Lincoln noted, to send receipts for the money already advanced to him. After an angry exchange of letters, Dooly did eventually provide the vouchers but he also included new bills for the services of his men that amounted to thirty thousand dollars.

The Difficulties of Loneliness
Everything went wrong in this Burke County campaign because of Dooly's failure to obtain any cooperation. Colonels John Twiggs and John Baker of the state's militia ignored his call and went on their own raid, alerting the king's garrison to its vulnerability. George Wells refused to recognize Georgia's makeshift government and Dooly's authority. Wells had been elected as the first colonel of the Wilkes County militia and, although he had been a very active officer in 1777, he had lost his position in a subsequent reorganization and election under the new state constitution. He would later win election to colonel in another newly created battalion in neighboring Richmond County. Whether he or Dooly actually held senior rank depended on whom one asked, with no impartial authority available to decide that now critical issue. Dooly had Wells court-martialed. Most of the British forces in South Carolina returned to Savannah before the militia in Augusta could finally march.

Despite this news, Dooly insisted on taking those militiamen who had not fallen sick into the military "no man's land" of Burke County. During that time, supplies from Lincoln finally arrived in Augusta but civilians seized even this succor and absconded with it to Wilkes County. Lincoln also failed to authorize a leave for Dooly's brothers, Robert and William, serving under him in the South Carolina continentals, that would have permitted them to visit John and their surviving brother George in Augusta. They would have been together for the first time since the war began. Whatever Dooly's campaign could have been, he and his men accomplished nothing more than a cattle-rustling raid that frightened Sir James Wright, the royal governor now restored to power in British-occupied Savannah.(n47)

Finally, in September, Benjamin Lincoln's army united with America's French allies in a campaign to retake Savannah. For the frontiersmen like Dooly, the uniformed professional French army and fleet, the vast artillery, and the sea of tents provided an inspiring spectacle that they never forgot and which must have seemed to guarantee the success of their cause. Loyalists across Georgia now joined in the Revolution as the outcome of the war in the favor of United States seemed assured.

Tides of War
This campaign should have been a last turning point that proved to be more decisive than the siege of Yorktown two years later. The professional British army, however, could hardly have been in a better position. Redcoats stranded in South Carolina succeeded in reaching Savannah to join the garrison in concentrating behind extensive fortifications and batteries that the engineers and slave labor erected almost overnight. Within Savannah, the British army, with its white, black, and red allies, had ample supplies of cattle and stores. The besiegers, by contrast, suffered from hunger, disease, and exposure while engaged in grueling but ineffective trench warfare. As part of an ad hoc brigade under Lachlan McIntosh, Dooly and his men participated in the disastrous Franco-American attack upon the British lines on October 9, 1779. The Georgia militia traveled half a mile across a swamp and into a barrage of musket and artillery fire as a British band serenaded them with Come to Maypole, Merry Farmers All. The bullets that fell around them often came from guns fired by Georgia Loyalists. Dooly and his militiamen hastily retreated. Elsewhere on the battlefield, the French army and the American continentals took huge losses while being repulsed largely by North and South Carolinians loyal to the king, some of whom had survived Kettle Creek. Overall, the allied forces suffered the second highest casualties of any side in a single battle of the Revolution, even without counting the many Americans who had already deserted. Immediately afterwards, the allies began to lift the siege and withdraw. Both sick and discouraged, Colonel Dooly returned home with his men.(n48)

The aftermath of these failures came to visit Dooly with a vengeance. Georgia's northern frontier had been a partner in the new state's government. With the British capturing Savannah and overrunning the coastal counties, the frontier had now become the state. Regular elections in December 1779 restored a functioning state government. The electorate, however, likely disenchanted with the council and its members from the refugees of occupied Georgia, as well as with the failures of the war, voted in new leadership from the radical anti-establishment party of the late Button Gwinnett. George Wells and other members of that faction had previously campaigned against the council to which Dooly belonged, even to the point of forming their own competing government. Wells now became governor, but quickly followed the example of Gwinnett and died at the hands of a political opponent, in this instance in a duel with the future governor James Jackson.(n49)

Initially, the new political leadership did try cooperation with Dooly. It approved his requests for more men and forts, as well as the right to sell slaves captured at Savannah to raise money for the militia. The question of Thomas Lee's claim to Leesburg reemerged, however. Georgia's original state government had ordered Dooly evicted from the Lee property but various circumstances (including Dooly being absent while leading militiamen against hostile Indians) had prevented the orders from being carried out before the British army captured Savannah and the state government disappeared. Exactly one year after the fight at Kettle Creek, the new government aided Thomas Lee in his suit to reclaim the land that Dooly had borrowed so heavily to improve, and even ordered Elijah Clarke to evict the Dooly family, by force, if necessary. The members of the governor's council stayed that order temporarily when they learned that Lee had never received a grant for the land in question, but they also ordered Dooly and Burwell Smith to answer for their past confiscation of cattle and supplies for use by the military.(n50)

Alone Again
The resurrected state government did not last long enough to see its mandates carried out. A chain of events began that would solve Dooly's problems with the new leaders but typically in a way that bode still worse for him. In the spring of 1780, a massively reinforced British army forced the surrender of General Lincoln, the continental American army of the South, and Charleston. Now the people of the backcountry had to face the king's army and its allies alone. Andrew Williamson convened a meeting of militia leaders in Augusta to decide what should be done. Dooly and Clarke argued for carrying on a guerrilla war, even without the regular American army, against the British lines around Charleston and Savannah. Williamson promised to consult with them further after he addressed his own men. Despite the general's pleas to continue the war, however, his South Carolina militiamen compelled him to surrender with them. They all became prisoners of war on parole. Dooly held a similar meeting at his home at Leesburg soon after, with the same result, except that thirty men under Elijah Clarke, Burwell Smith, and Sanders Walker, a Baptist minister whom Dooly had chosen as regimental chaplain, decided to continue fighting as guerrillas in South Carolina. Stephen Heard, now the governor, and the remnants of the government moved to Heard's Fort in Wilkes County and then disbanded.

William Manson, a Scotsman whose foreign settlement project in the Ceded Lands had failed because of the Revolution, arrived in Wilkes County to accept the surrender of John Dooly and four hundred of the Georgia militia on a ridge outside the town of Washington in late June 1780. Manson acted on behalf of Thomas Brown, a lieutenant colonel in command of Loyalist provincials and Indians who now occupied Augusta. Brown, an Englishman, had suffered terrible torture at the hands of a Whig mob and had also been wounded in battle for the king's cause. He too originally came to Georgia to create a Ceded Lands settlement, but it had shared the same fate as Manson's Friendsborough.(n51)

Even then Dooly would not find peace. His creditors from before and during the war pressed him for payment.(n52) Georgia now became the only American state ever completely reduced to colony status. The restored colonial assembly included Dooly in its act to disqualify former rebels from ever holding any public office. On June 3, 1780, British general Sir Henry Clinton revoked almost all of the paroles, thereby unintentionally freeing Dooly, Pickens, and others to return to the American cause without violating their oaths. Two months later, men who had not joined the restored colonial militia could have their property confiscated. Loyalist leaders such as Brown and Wright believed that Dooly and other men on parole only waited for just such an excuse to return to the war. These concerns seemed justified when, in September 1780, Elijah Clarke led Georgia and South Carolina guerrillas in attacking and nearly capturing Brown and the garrison in Augusta.

Rescued and reinforced by South Carolina Loyalist provincials, the long-suffering Tories and Indians then began a campaign of retaliation as they went from being the oppressed to the avenged, starting with the executions of men captured during Clarke's attack on the Augusta garrison. From John Dooly's home, Lt. Col. J.H. Cruger announced the arrival of his Loyalist force in the Ceded Lands. He dispatched colonial militia under Thomas Waters and others to destroy the forts, courthouse, and settlements of Wilkes County. Wright reported that at least one hundred homes were razed. Families believed to have supported the Revolution followed Clarke into exile, or their men became prisoners confined in Augusta.(n53) Exact information has not survived, but John Dooly, having almost no other options, apparently wanted to return to the rebellion. Before he could do so, however, men arrived at his house and killed him, quite likely in revenge for his actions earlier in the war.(n54) Sanders Walker, at the least, risked his reputation with both sides to seek a truce. Clarke's request to British general Lord Charles Cornwallis for a cessation of hostilities also went unanswered.(n55)

Terrible Scenario
Loyalist and British leaders learned too late that, through atrocities such as the killing of John Dooly, they created rather than suppressed a widespread uprising. Clarke's rebels had consisted of relatively few men and many of them only came along under threats to their lives and property; even Pickens and Williamson had refused to cooperate with him. Royal lieutenant governor John Graham took a census of Wilkes County and came away anything but encouraged. He found that of 723 men, only 255 could be counted on for the Loyalist militia but that at least 411 had at least now joined the rebels. Even that situation deteriorated. Some Wilkes Countians who must have fought with Dooly at Kettle Creek as Whigs would now serve as "Loyalist" conscripted militia. Reportedly 150 of the area's royal militia were subsequently killed, while serving on assignment in South Carolina under Col. Thomas Waters, in the battle of Hammond's Store in December 1780. They fell near the homes of the Raeburn Creek Loyalists who had been defeated more than a year earlier in Wilkes County at Kettle Creek.(n56)

The American Comeback
The American army in the South would make a decisive comeback under Gen. Nathanael Greene. His professional army, in cooperation with partisans, over the next two years drove the British from the South and started the string of events that directly resulted in the decisive Franco-American victory at Yorktown. Elijah Clarke and other Georgia frontiersmen played significant roles in those battles and campaigns. The former Wilkes County militiamen who had served under John Dooly participated in the major victory at King's Mountain and played critical roles in the American success at the Battle of Cowpens. Emistisiguo's fate also became intertwined with the final days of the Revolution. He had led warriors in attacks on settlers in modern Kentucky and Tennessee who had come to the aid of the American cause at King's Mountain and in Wilkes County. On July 24, 1782, in his final act for his British patrons, he died in hand-to-hand combat with Gen. Anthony Wayne while leading a Creek war party and Loyalists in a desperate but successful effort to break through to the garrison at Savannah. The Creek headman thus joined John Dooly and so many other leaders of their conflicted and conflicting societies in failing to survive the war.(n57)

The British evacuated Savannah and Georgia on July 11, 1782. In one of its last acts, the restored colonial Georgia assembly provided the Ceded Lands with courts and separate political representation through the formation of two new parishes.(n58) Even as a symbolic expression of creating local government, like so much of the British policy during the American Revolution, this action came as far too little and much too late for anything more than demonstrating that the civil progress on the frontier existed as something greater than even the war with which it happened to coexist.

Dooly's Revenge
In the latter part of the Revolution, George Dooly led a company that repeatedly took revenge for the deaths of his brothers Thomas, John, and Robert in the American cause.(n59) Little else came from John Dooly's participation in the American Revolution. Had he lived, he might have had a successful postwar career in the military and in politics, as did Andrew Pickens and Elijah Clarke. The latter would rise to the rank of major general and would fight to obtain Creek Indian lands for Georgia, inside and outside of the restraints of the official government authority. For his services and sacrifices in the Revolution, Clarke received the confiscated Thomas Waters's property. He would also set up his son John's successful public career that would eventually include governor of Georgia.(n60) Even Thomas Lee lived a long life.(n61) If Dooly's reputation suffered as a Patriot for having surrendered, as Andrew Williamson's did, and his property in Georgia had gone to his creditors, he could still have moved with his brother George Dooly and sister Elizabeth Dooly Murry Bibb to the Kentucky frontier and, like them, start a new life.(n62)

Even after his death, however, the Dooly family's troubles did not end. The restored state government granted land in recognition of Dooly's military service to his minors, but also ordered Elijah Clarke to evict Dooly's widow and orphans from the  Leesburg plantation in response to Thomas Lee's claims. Reportedly, the modern Elijah Clarke State Park in Lincoln County (created in 1796 from Wilkes County and named for Benjamin Lincoln) encompasses that land, including John Dooly's burial place somewhere near the "Dooly Spring."

The Creditors last attack
Creditors, including Thomas Waters (in exile in England after finding sanctuary with the Cherokees) made claims against Dooly's estate, leaving little money for the family. In spite of the poverty, John's last surviving son, John Mitchell Dooly studied law and would also have the distinction of becoming well known in Georgia literature.(n63) He quite likely used the considerable influence he later gained as an important judge and politician, along with John Dooly's notoriety as published in McCall's history, to encourage the state legislature to create a county named for his father in 1821. That recognition, however, came years after the legislature authorized counties honoring Elijah Clarke, John Twiggs, Button Gwinnett, James Jackson, and many of his father's other contemporaries. Dooly County suffered several Creek Indian attacks in its early years, an irony considering the career of its namesake. Even the honor of having a county named for Dooly dimmed when, in 1840, a novelist portrayed a fictional Dooly family as Loyalists. Judge Dooly's widow viewed this work as an insult to the memory of her father-in-law and his brothers. An old veteran was consulted on the matter and stated of John Dooly: "Why truly [sic] he was a real Liberty man I know it as well as I know anything; for he saved my father's life once … [but] he was the only one in his family who was not [a Loyalist] his brothers were tories."(n64)

Legacy
John Dooly is the namesake of Dooly County, Georgia.

Notes

References
Profile of John Dooly at USGenWeb, Georgia.
Information on John Dooly from GeorgiaInfo / Carl Vinson Institute of Government at the University of Georgia
 

1740 births
1780 deaths
American Revolutionary War deaths
Georgia (U.S. state) militiamen in the American Revolution
People from Wilkes County, Georgia
18th-century American people